Camera Mapping may refer to
 Aerial survey, map production from stereo photographs captured from the air
 Photomapping, production of a map by joining a series of photographs
 Photogrammetry, mapping the geometry of an object using photographs, or stereo photographic pairs
 Videogrammetry, determining three-dimensional geometry of an object using pairs of photographs